Waiākea High School is a public, co-educational secondary school in Hilo, Hawaii.  The school's mascot is the Warrior.  It is part of the Hawaii State Department of Education. The school graduated its first class in 1980, and has about 1300 students. It is across the street from the University of Hawaii at Hilo.  The campus boasts the sculpture Landscape on the Ocean by Satoru Abe.  Waiākea High School's crosstown rival is Hilo High School.

Athletics
Athletic Director: Tommy Correa
Assistant Director: Donn Yamamoto
Athletic Trainers: Sharyn Kodama and Dayton Uyeda

Waiākea is a member of the Big Island Interscholastic Federation and has won state athletic championships in several sports, including 11 in boys golf, most recently in 2003. The boys Air Riflery team also took the state championship in 2004 and in 2010.

bold denotes HHSAA tournament champions

bold denotes HHSAA tournament champions

In 2003, the girls' swimming team took the State Championships in both freestyle and individual medley relays.
 
Boys/Girls Judo

In 2008, Ryan Higa took first place in state for his weight division for wrestling and took second in Judo.

In 2003, 2009 and 2014 the cheerleading team placed second at the State Championships.
In 2012 and 2015 the cheerleading team placed second at the JAMZ National Cheer & Dance Competition.

Principals
Waiākea High School has had a number of principals over its history.  They are as follows in chronological order: Robert Bean, John Sosa, Danford Sakai, Michael Tokioka, Patricia Nekoba, and currently Kelcy Koga.

A Honolulu Star-Bulletin article (published Monday, February 18, 2002) states, "Since its beginning, Waiākea has had six principals: Robert Bean, John Sosa, Danford Sakai, Michael Tokioka, Patricia Nekoba and currently Judith Saranchock. It has had three principals and two interim principals in the past four years."  It is uncertain if all "three principals and two interim principals" were included in the Honolulu Star-Bulletin's list.

The current principal, Kelcy Koga, returned to Waiākea High School after the retirement of Dr. Patricia Nekoba, who left in December 2006.  He previously served as Vice Principal until his departure for Haaheo Elementary School.

Restructuring
Waiākea High School in 2003 began restructuring itself into Smaller Learning Communities from money allocated through a federal grant.  These Smaller Learning Communities (more commonly referred to as SLCs) include 9th and 10th grade houses and career academies for 11th and 12th graders.  These academies include Business, Health and Fitness, Public and Human Services, Pacific Rim Cultures and Natural Resources, Industrial Technology and Engineering, and Arts and Communications.

Waiākea has also added a Mentorship program, which is required for all upper level students.  Students are placed into a mentorship based on academy preference.

A new all weather track and football field were constructed in 2008, replacing the original aging track and football field.

In 2002, a fire started overnight in building R and caused an estimated $400,000 in damage.  The building was restored and reopened in 2005. 

In 2006, another fire broke out, purportedly started by an arsonist, causing a purported $1.5 million in damage.

Notable alumni
Kai Correa - Major League Baseball coach for the San Francisco Giants
Ryan Higa - YouTube personality
Billy Kenoi - former Mayor of Hawaii County 2008-2016
Darren Kimura - businessman
Onan Masaoka - former professional baseball player for the Los Angeles Dodgers
Kodi Medeiros - professional baseball player
Brad Tavares - professional Mixed Martial Artist (who competes for UFC)
Kean Wong - MLB player for the Los Angeles Angels

External links
Official Site
Honolulu Star-Bulletin articles: "Waiakea shines at silver anniversary" and "School puts kids in real-world classroom"

References

Public high schools in Hawaii County, Hawaii
Buildings and structures in Hilo, Hawaii
Educational institutions established in 1976
1976 establishments in Hawaii
Education in Hilo, Hawaii